William Flynn (born May 29, 1985) is an American actor and producer. He is known for portraying Chad DiMera on the NBC soap opera Days of Our Lives.

Early life
Flynn was born in St. Francis, Minnesota. He graduated from St. Cloud State University in 2007, majoring in finance and minoring in economics. In the same year Flynn did an internship and worked at Accenture as a financial analyst. In 2010 he took a job as an analyst at Warner Bros. Studios, where he worked for four years.

Career
Flynn is managed by PCM International. He moved to Los Angeles to pursue an acting career. Before making his acting debut, Flynn worked with director Jake Scott in 2013, by appearing in a Taco Bell commercial. In the same year he made his acting debut as Liret in the short movie 80 in 10. He did a campaign of "Silk" for photographer Bryony Shearmur.

In February 2014 Flynn had a guest role on the CBS television series Hawaii Five-0, in the episode "Hoku Welowelo". Flynn played Nick Spitz, opposite Melanie Griffith. Flynn also co-produced a short movie, Solely. In August 2014 DAYS co-executive producer Greg Meng confirmed to Soap Opera Digest that Flynn had joined the cast of NBC soap opera Days of Our Lives as a recast of Chad DiMera, previously played by Casey Deidrick. Flynn debuted on September 12, 2014. In October 2016 Deadline confirmed that Flynn had booked a role in the thriller movie D.O.A. Blood River.

Personal life
Flynn became engaged to Gina Comparetto on May 29, 2015, his 30th birthday. He and Comparetto married on October 1, 2016.  In a 2021 episode of Maurice Benard's program State of Mind, Flynn acknowledged battling substance addiction.

Filmography

Awards and nominations

References

External links
 
 

1985 births
American male film actors
American male soap opera actors
American male television actors
Living people
Male actors from Minnesota
People from St. Francis, Minnesota
St. Cloud State University alumni